Richard Purdy Wilbur (March 1, 1921 – October 14, 2017) was an American poet and literary translator. One of the foremost poets of his generation, Wilbur's work, composed primarily in traditional forms, was marked by its wit, charm, and gentlemanly elegance. He was appointed the second Poet Laureate Consultant in Poetry to the Library of Congress in 1987 and received the Pulitzer Prize for Poetry twice, in 1957 and 1989.

Early years
Wilbur was born in New York City on March 1, 1921, and grew up in North Caldwell, New Jersey. In 1938 he graduated from Montclair High School, where he worked on the school newspaper. He graduated from Amherst College in 1942 and served in the United States Army from 1943 to 1945 during World War II. He attended graduate school at Harvard University. Wilbur taught at Wellesley College, then Wesleyan University for two decades and at Smith College for another decade. At Wesleyan he was instrumental in founding the award-winning poetry series of the University Press. He received two Pulitzer Prizes for Poetry and taught at Amherst College as late as 2009. He was on the editorial board of the literary magazine The Common, based at Amherst College.

Literary career
When only eight years old, Wilbur published his first poem in John Martin's Magazine. His first book, The Beautiful Changes and Other Poems, appeared in 1947. Thereafter he published several volumes of poetry, including New and Collected Poems (Faber, 1989). Wilbur was also a translator, specializing in the 17th century French comedies of Molière and dramas of Jean Racine. His translation of Tartuffe has become the play's standard English version and has been presented on television twice (a 1978 production is available on DVD). Wilbur also published several children's books, including Opposites, More Opposites, and The Disappearing Alphabet. In 1959 he became the general editor of The Laurel Poetry Series (Dell Publishing).

Continuing the tradition of Robert Frost and W. H. Auden, Wilbur's poetry finds illumination in everyday experiences. Less well-known is Wilbur's foray into writing theatre lyrics. He provided lyrics to several songs in Leonard Bernstein's 1956 musical Candide, including the famous "Glitter and Be Gay" and "Make Our Garden Grow". He also produced several unpublished works, including "The Wing" and "To Beatrice".

His honors included the 1983 Drama Desk Special Award and the PEN Translation Prize for his translation of The Misanthrope, the Pulitzer Prize for Poetry and the National Book Award for Things of This World (1956),
the Edna St Vincent Millay award, the Bollingen Prize, and the Chevalier, Ordre des Palmes Académiques. He was elected a Fellow of the American Academy of Arts and Sciences in 1959. In 1987 Wilbur became the second poet, after Robert Penn Warren, to be named U.S. Poet Laureate after the position's title was changed from Poetry Consultant. In 1988 he won the Aiken Taylor Award for Modern American Poetry and in 1989 he won a second Pulitzer, for his New and Collected Poems. On October 14, 1994, he received the National Medal of Arts from President Bill Clinton. He also received the PEN/Ralph Manheim Medal for Translation in 1994. In 2003 Wilbur was inducted into the American Theater Hall of Fame. In 2006 he won the Ruth Lilly Poetry Prize. In 2010 he won the National Translation Award for the translation of The Theatre of Illusion by Pierre Corneille. In 2012 Yale University conferred an honorary Doctor of Letters on Wilbur.

Wilbur died on October 14, 2017, at a nursing home in Belmont, Massachusetts, from natural causes aged 96.

Awards and honors
During his lifetime, Wilbur received numerous awards in recognition of his work, including:

 Guggenheim Fellowship for Creative Arts (1952, 1963)
 Poetry Society of America Millay Award (1957)
 National Book Award for Poetry (1957) for Things of This World
 Pulitzer Prize for Poetry (1957, 1989) for Things of This World, New and Collected Poems
 Bollingen Prize for Poetry (1971)
 Shelley Memorial Award (1973) 
 New York Drama Critics' Circle Award for Best Musical (1973–1974) for Candide
 Outer Critics Circle Award for Best Musical (1973–1974) for Candide
 Drama Desk Special Award (1983) for translation of The Misanthrope
 United States Poet Laureate (1987–1988)
 Laurence Olivier Award for Musical of the Year (1988) for Candide
 St. Louis Literary Award from the Saint Louis University Library Associates
 American Academy of Arts and Letters Gold Medal in Poetry (1991)
 Golden Plate Award of the American Academy of Achievement (1995)
 PEN/Ralph Manheim Medal for Translation (1994)
 Frost Medal (1996)
 Wallace Stevens Award (2003)
 Ruth Lilly Poetry Prize (2006)
 Edward MacDowell Medal (1992)

Bibliography

Poetry collections
 1947: The Beautiful Changes, and Other Poems
 1950: Ceremony, and Other Poems 
 1955: A Bestiary 
 1956: Things of This World – won Pulitzer Prize for Poetry and National Book Award, both in 1957
 1961: Advice to a Prophet, and Other Poems 
 1969: Walking to Sleep: New Poems and Translations 
 1976: The Mind-Reader: New Poems
 1988: New and Collected Poems – won Pulitzer Prize for Poetry in 1989
 2000: Mayflies: New Poems and Translations 
 2004: Collected Poems, 1943–2004 
 2010: Anterooms

Selected poems available online

Prose collections
 1976: Responses: Prose Pieces, 1953–1976
 1997: The Catbird's Song: Prose Pieces, 1963–1995

Translated plays from other authors

Translated from Molière
 The Misanthrope (1955/1666)
 Tartuffe (1963/1669)
 The School for Wives (1971/1662)
 The Learned Ladies (1978/1672)
 The School for Husbands (1992/1661)
 The Imaginary Cuckold, or Sganarelle (1993/1660)
 Amphitryon (1995/1668)
 The Bungler (2000/1655)
 Don Juan (2001/1665)
 Lovers' Quarrels (2009/1656)

From Jean Racine
 Andromache (1982/1667)
 Phaedra (1986/1677)
 The Suitors (2001/1668)

From Pierre Corneille
 The Theatre of Illusion (2007/1636)
 Le Cid (2009/1636)
 The Liar (2009/1643)

References

Citations

Sources
 .

Further reading
 
 King, Brendan D., The Poet and the Counterrevolution: Richard Wilbur, the Free Verse Revolution, and the Revival of Rhymed Poetry, St Austin Review, March/April 2020, American Literature in the Twentieth Century, pages 15-19.
Richard Wilbur and the Things of This World, a documentary film by Ralph Hammann, 2017, Film Odysseys, Ltd. To be released.

External links

"The World is Fundamentally a Great Wonder": Richard Wilbur in conversation with Arlo Haskell, October 21, 2009. Littoral.
Readings by Wilbur at the Key West Literary Seminar: 1993, 2003, 2010

Ernest Hilbert reviews Richard Wilbur's Collected Poems for the New York Sun
Essays on a Wilbur's "Love Calls Us to the Things of This World"

Settings of Richard Wilbur's poetry in the Choral Public Domain Library
Wilbur's "Then" (1950) – Composer Jonathan Elliott sets Wilbur's poem to music for Monadnock Music; also featuring Wilbur's reading of the poem
Richard P. Wilbur (AC 1942) Papers at the Amherst College Archives & Special Collections

1921 births
2017 deaths
American male poets
Anglican poets
Formalist poets
United States National Medal of Arts recipients
American Poets Laureate
National Book Award winners
Pulitzer Prize for Poetry winners
Amherst College alumni
Harvard Advocate alumni
Wesleyan University faculty
Smith College faculty
Montclair High School (New Jersey) alumni
People from North Caldwell, New Jersey
Writers from New York City
Poets from New York (state)
Poets from New Jersey
Sonneteers
Fellows of the American Academy of Arts and Sciences
Chevaliers of the Ordre des Palmes Académiques
Bollingen Prize recipients
French–English translators
Broadway composers and lyricists
United States Army personnel of World War II
Anglican lay readers
World War II poets
20th-century translators
United States Army soldiers
Presidents of the American Academy of Arts and Letters